"Break On Through (To the Other Side)" is a song written and recorded by the Doors.  It is the opening track of their debut album, The Doors (1967). Elektra Records issued the song as the group's first single, which reached number 126 in the United States. Despite the single's failure to impact the record sales charts, the song became a concert staple for the band.

Twenty-four years after its original release, "Break On Through" became a minor hit in the UK after it was released as a single from the soundtrack album The Doors, peaking at number 64 in the UK Singles Chart.

Musical structure and composition
"Break On Through" is an uptempo song notated in 4/4 time, and adheres the pitches of the Aeolian mode.  It begins with a bossa nova drum groove in which a clave pattern is played as a rim click underneath a driving ride cymbal pattern. John Densmore appreciated the new bossa nova craze coming from Brazil at the time, and decided to use it in the song.  The track's musical style features influences from mambo music. The bass line, similar to a typical bass line used in bossa nova, continues almost all of the way through the song.

Robby Krieger has stated that the guitar riff he played was inspired by the one in Paul Butterfield's version of the song "Shake Your Moneymaker" (originally by blues guitarist Elmore James). In his autobiography, Ray Manzarek commented that his keyboard part was inspired by Stan Getz and João Gilberto's bossa nova album Getz/Gilberto. Other sources have been identified as Ray Charles's "What'd I Say" (bassline) and Them's "One Two Brown Eyes". In a review of the latter, Richie Unterberger elaborated:

Critical reception
In a song review for AllMusic, critic Lindsay Planer comments that Morrison's lyrics "reveal a literacy that had rarely been incorporated into rock music":

"Break On Through (To the Other Side)" was described by Billboard as an "excitement filled rocker" that represents a "powerful debut."  Cash Box said the single is a "driving pulsating track that should see plenty of spins." It has also been widely considered one of the band's greatest songs. In 2021, The Guardian ranked the song number two on their list of the 30 greatest Doors songs, and Louder Sound ranked it number five on their list of the 20 greatest Doors songs. In 2012 the song was selected to be played on Mars during a NASA mission.

Personnel
Jim Morrison – vocals
Ray Manzarek – Vox Continental organ, keyboard bass
Robby Krieger – guitar
John Densmore – drums

Certifications

References

The Doors songs
1967 debut singles
1967 songs
Songs written by John Densmore
Songs written by Robby Krieger
Songs written by Ray Manzarek
Songs written by Jim Morrison
Song recordings produced by Paul A. Rothchild
Elektra Records singles
1967 neologisms
Quotations from music